David William Kinloch Anderson, Baron Anderson of Ipswich,  (born 5 July 1961) is a British barrister and life peer, who was the Independent Reviewer of Terrorism Legislation in the United Kingdom between 2011 and 2017.  On 8 June 2018 it was announced that he would be introduced to the House of Lords as a cross-bench (non-party) working peer. On the same day he was appointed a Knight Commander of the Order of the British Empire (KBE), for services to national security and civil liberties, in the Queen's 2018 Birthday Honours.

His father was Sir Eric Anderson, former Headmaster of Eton College, who taught Prince Charles, Tony Blair, David Cameron and Boris Johnson.

Career

Legal practice 
Anderson came to the English Bar after spells in Washington DC (1985–86) at Covington and Burling and in Brussels (1987–88) in the private office of Lord Cockfield, the European Commissioner tasked with completing the Internal Market.

As a practitioner since 1988 at Brick Court Chambers in London and King's Counsel since 1999, Anderson is best known for his 150 cases in the Court of Justice of the European Union, including his appearances for the applicants in the landmark constitutional cases Factortame (supremacy of EU law:1988-2000) and Kadi (UN/EU terrorist sanctions: 2005–2010).  He practises in the full range of English courts: his cases in the highest court include the free speech case ProLife Alliance v BBC and Heathrow  Airport's appeal in the third runway case.   Among more than 30 cases that he has presented to the European Court of Human Rights are Bowman v UK (free speech and election spending), McGonnell v UK (separation of powers), Hatton v UK (environmental rights), Demopoulos v Turkey (property rights) and Gaunt v UK (journalistic freedom of expression).

Anderson is a Bencher of Middle Temple, sat as a Recorder of the Crown Court from 2004 to 2013, and has since 2014 been a Judge of the Courts of Appeal of Guernsey and Jersey, where he was also the Investigatory Powers Commissioner between 2017 and 2020.  Among other professional honours, Anderson was described as the UK's "Legal Personality of the Year" in 2015, and as one of London's 1000 most influential people in 2017.

National security 
Anderson  succeeded Lord Carlile of Berriew CBE QC as the UK's Independent Reviewer of Terrorism Legislation in February 2011.  He stepped down after two three-year terms as Independent Reviewer, and was succeeded in post by Max Hill QC on 1 March 2017.  All but one of his 20 reports as Independent Reviewer were laid before Parliament and published in full.

Counter-terrorism law 
Both Government and opposition credited Anderson for his influence on the Justice and Security Act 2013, which governs the use of closed material procedures in UK courts.  His reports and evidence to Parliament also influenced the law governing Terrorism Prevention and Investigation Measures (TPIMs, the successors to control orders), which were reformulated in accordance with his recommendations in 2015; the scope of the power to stop and detain travellers under Schedule 7 to the Terrorism Act 2000; and the practice of asset-freezing.  Other reports concerned the deprivation of citizenship and the practice of deportation with assurances.

The UK Supreme Court referred to Anderson's work with approval in R v Gul (2013) and Beghal v DPP (2015), as did the European Court of Human Rights in Beghal v UK (2019).  He wrote in 2014 and 2017 on the channels by which the Independent Reviewer may hope to influence the law and policy of counter-terrorism. Some broader reflections on terrorism and the law were published in 2013 and 2018, and on reporting terrorism in 2019.

Surveillance 
"A Question of Trust", Anderson's June 2015 report of his Investigatory Powers Review, described the obscurity of the then law as "undemocratic, unnecessary and – in the long run – intolerable".  Its 125 recommendations aimed to replace it with "a clear, coherent and accessible scheme, adapted to the world of internet-based communications and encryption".  The report has been described in an opinion piece by an editor at The Guardian as "the turning point that policymakers have looked for and missed ever since 9/11", and was a blueprint for the Investigatory Powers Act 2016.  Following publication of the report, Anderson was shortlisted in 2015 by ISPA for its "Internet Hero of the Year" award.

In August 2016 followed the report of Anderson's Bulk Powers Review, with 60 case studies, which examined the operational case for the bulk retention of data by MI5, MI6 and GCHQ and is a significant factual resource for debates on "mass surveillance".  Both these reports were relied upon by the European Court of Human Rights in its Big Brother Watch judgments of September 2018 and May 2021. Anderson's expert evidence in the Irish High Court on police use of communications data was relied upon by the Supreme Court in its Dwyer judgment of February 2020.

Counter-extremism 
Anderson has criticised the UK's broad definition of terrorism, and warned in September 2015 of potential dangers in the Government's proposed Counter-Extremism Bill, subsequently shelved.  He published a lecture on "Extremism and the Law" in 2019.  He has also written and broadcast on the Prevent strategy, and on human rights as an aid to the fight against terrorism and extremism.  He was a member of the Expert Group advising the Counter-Extremism Commission from July 2018 to July 2019.

Intelligence-handling
On 28 June 2017, after stepping down from the post of Independent Reviewer of Terrorism Legislation, Anderson was commissioned by Home Secretary Amber Rudd to provide independent assurance of the detailed review work commissioned by MI5 and Counter-Terrorism Police into their handling of intelligence prior to the four terrorist attacks in London and Manchester between March and June 2017. His report, which quality-assured the conclusions and operational improvements arrived at by MI5 and the police with his input, was published in December 2017, with a follow-up in June 2019.

House of Lords 
Having applied to be a "people's peer", Anderson was nominated for a life peerage by the independent House of Lords Appointments Commission in June 2018. He was created Baron Anderson of Ipswich, of Ipswich in the County of Suffolk, on 10 July, and sits as a cross-bencher.  He gave his maiden speech on 19 July 2018 in a debate on the impact of referendums on parliamentary democracy.  Since then he has been active on a wide range of issues, ranging from national security, policing and internet safety to constitutional and EU-related matters. A strong opponent of  Brexit, he moved the amendment in July 2019 that limited the Government's scope to prorogue Parliament, and spoke and wrote against the dangers of populism and of a no-deal Brexit.  On the national security front, his amendments resulted in changes to the designated area offence and to border security powers in the Counter-Terrorism and Border Security Act 2019.

In the 2019-2022 parliamentary sessions, Anderson tabled or was closely involved in amendments to Bills which became the United Kingdom Internal Market Act 2020 (removal of the clauses providing for unilateral departure from the Northern Ireland Protocol), the Overseas Operations Act 2021 (removal of presumption against prosecution of offences within the jurisdiction of the International Criminal Court), the Domestic Abuse Act 2021 (creation of a new offence of strangulation or suffocation), the Covert Human Intelligence Sources (Criminal Conduct) Act 2021 (requirement to notify criminal conduct authorisations to Judicial Commissioners; provision of access to criminal injuries compensation), the Counter-Terrorism and Sentencing Act 2021 (criteria for and maximum duration of Terrorism Prevention and Investigation Measures), the Environment Act 2021 (enlarging judicial remedies available to the Office for Environmental Protection), the Judicial Review and Courts Act 2022 (removal of presumption in favour of suspended or prospective-only quashing orders) and the Nationality and Borders Act 2022 (limitations on the power to remove citizenship without notice; introduction of judicial and administrative safeguards). He was a member from 2019-2020 of the EU Justice Sub-Committee of the House of Lords, and from 2020-21 of the EU Security and Justice Sub-Committee. Since February 2021 he has served as co-Chair (with Sir Bob Neill MP) of the All-Party Parliamentary Group on the Rule of Law.

On 5 September 2022, Anderson tabled the Public Service (Integrity and Ethics) Bill, seeking to give effect to recommendations of the Committee on Standards in Public Life. The Bill would place three standards watchdogs on a statutory footing, increase the level of independence in their appointment processes and give the Independent Adviser on Ministers' Interests the power to launch investigations into potential breaches of the Ministerial Code and to report on whether breaches have occurred.

Anderson has spoken and written about topics ranging from genocide to scrutiny of international agreements and the dangers of executive over-reach. He favours greater use of online procedures by the legislature and a more open appointment system to the House of Lords. In 2021 he recorded a podcast for primary age children about the work of the House of Lords, and another for adults on the theme of "stepping outside the law".  His parliamentary speeches and questions are collected here.

Academic and charitable interests 
Since 2000 Anderson has at various times been a trustee or a member of the advisory/editorial board of legal and educational institutions including the Centre of European Law at the Dickson Poon School of Law, the British Association for Central and Eastern Europe, the UCL School of Slavonic and East European Studies, the Slynn Foundation, the British Institute of International and Comparative Law and the European Human Rights Law Review.   He is the author of References to the European Court (Sweet & Maxwell 1995, 2nd edn. with Marie Demetriou 2002) and various articles in learned journals.  He has also written for publications including The Times, The Daily Telegraph, The Evening Standard, Prospect and The House, and is a regular contributor to the Literary Review. Anderson has been since 1999 a Visiting Professor at King's College London and is a former General Editor of the OUP's Oxford European Union Law Library.  Having lectured widely on legal topics in central and eastern Europe, he was appointed between 2000 and 2004 by the Secretary General of the Council of Europe to monitor and report to the Committee of Ministers on the freedom of the media in Georgia, Russia, Turkey and Ukraine.

Since July 2019 Anderson has chaired Inter Mediate, a charity engaged in mediation and negotiation whose CEO is Jonathan Powell, and which focuses on some of the most difficult, dangerous and complex conflicts worldwide. He also chairs the Advisory Board of the UCL European Institute.

Auld Alliance Trophy 
A native of Edinburgh, Anderson was the co-promoter, (with Patrick Caublot of Amiens Rugby Club) of the Auld Alliance Trophy.  First awarded (to Scotland) in February 2018, and presented every year at the Six Nations rugby international between Scotland and France, the solid silver trophy commemorates the rugby players of both nations who lost their lives in the First World War.  It bears the names of Anderson's great-great-uncle Eric Milroy (Scotland's captain in 1914, killed at Delville Wood in July 1916) and of his French counterpart, the aviator Marcel Burgun.

Bibliography 
Anderson, David, References to the European Court (Sweet & Maxwell, 1995; 2nd edn. with Marie Demetriou, 2002)
Anderson, David, A Question of Trust (HMSO, 2015)
Anderson, David, Report of Bulk Powers Review (Cm 9326, 2016)
 Anderson, David, Compilation of writings on counter-terrorism, surveillance and extremism, 2011-2017
 Film of David Anderson QC's work from The Daily Politics, BBC2, 16 March 2016: 
 Rozenberg, Joshua interview with David Anderson, Law in Action, BBC Radio 4, 3 November 2016 (Terrorism, Extremism and the Law: podcast) 
 Anderson, David, Op-Ed on the Prevent strategy, Evening Standard, 15 February 2017
 Oborne, Peter, Terrorism: A History of Violence (profile of David Anderson), Middle East Eye, 17 February 2017
 Anderson, David, "Not for wimps: the pragmatic case for human rights", HuffPost UK, 7 June 2017
 Anderson, David "Understanding Prevent", BBC Radio 4, 25 July 2017 podcast
 Anderson, David personal website (2017-)

Arms

References

External links 
 
 
 

Living people
British barristers
1961 births
People's peers
English King's Counsel
21st-century King's Counsel
Knights Commander of the Order of the British Empire
Life peers created by Elizabeth II